James Kane Kinsella (born 22 July 1947) is a Scottish former footballer who played for Dumbarton, East Fife, East Stirlingshire and Ayr United.

References

1947 births
Living people
Scottish footballers
Association football forwards
Dumbarton F.C. players
East Fife F.C. players
East Stirlingshire F.C. players
Ayr United F.C. players
Scottish Football League players